Derf is a nickname. Notable people with the nickname include:

Derf Backderf or John Backderf (born 1959), American cartoonist
Derf Scratch (1951–2010), American musician, bass guitarist, former member of the punk rock band Fear

See also
Derfel (disambiguation)
Dern